The Diocese of Makarska was a Latin Catholic bishopric from 533 to 590, from 1344 to 1400 and from 1615 until its 1828 merger into the (meanwhile Metropolitan Arch)Diocese of Split-Makarska, which preserves its title.

No statistics available.

History 
 Established in 533 as Diocese of Makarska / Macarsca (Curiate Italian), on territory split off from the Diocese of Narona.
 Suppressed in 590, its territory being reassigned partly to the Metropolitan Archdiocese of Salona (now Split; Croatia), and partly to establish the Diocese of Duvno (Bosnia).
 Restored in 1344 as Diocese of Makarska / Macarsca (Italian), on territory (re)gained from the above Metropolitan Archdiocese of Salona
 Suppressed in 1400, merged (back) into the Metropolitan Archdiocese of Salona (Split)
 Restored in 1615 as Diocese of Makarska / Macarsca (Italian), regaining its territory from Metropolitan Archdiocese of Salona. 
 In 1663 it (re)gained territory from the suppressed above Diocese of Duvno.
 In 1735 it lost territory to establish the then Apostolic Vicariate of Bosnia
 Suppressed on 1828.06.30, merged into the renamed Roman Catholic Diocese of Split–Makarska (absorbing its title and territory), which later became a Metropolitan Archbishopric.

Episcopal ordinaries 
(all Roman Rite)
incomplete : sixth century lacking

Suffragan Bishops of Makarska 
 Valentino (1344 – 1367)
 Giacomo (1369.02.08 – ?) 
 Giovanni, Dominican Order (O.P.) (1373.07.18 – ?)
 Bartol Kačić, Friars Minor (O.F.M.) (1615.06.15 – death 1645)
 Petar Kačić, O.F.M. (1646.06.25 – 1663)
 Marijan Lišnjić, O.F.M. (1664.02.11 – death 1686.03.03)
 Nikola Bijanković, Oratorians (C.O.) (1698.12.19 – death 1730.08.10)
 Stjepan Blasković, C.O. (1731.09.24 – death 1776.11)
 Fabijan Blasković (1777.12.15 – death 1820).

See also 
 List of Catholic dioceses in Croatia

References

Sources and external links 
 GCatholic - bishopric, data for all sections  
 GCatholic - former cathedral  

Former Roman Catholic dioceses in Europe
Suppressed Roman Catholic dioceses